Vladislav Lyakh (born 13 August 1999) is a Belarusian professional footballer who plays for Arsenal Dzerzhinsk.

References

External links 
 
 

1999 births
Living people
Belarusian footballers
Association football defenders
FC Dinamo Minsk players
FC Lokomotiv Gomel players
FC Arsenal Dzerzhinsk players